Toxabramis hotayensis is a species of ray-finned fish in the genus Toxabramis. It is found in  Vietnam.

References

Toxabramis
Fish of Vietnam
Fish described in 2001